Slavsky (masculine), Slavskaya (feminine), or Slavskoye (neuter) may refer to:
Slavsky District, a district of Kaliningrad Oblast, Russia
Slavskoye Urban Settlement, a municipal formation which the town of district significance of Slavsk in Slavsky District of Kaliningrad Oblast, Russia is incorporated as
Slavskoye, Russia, a rural locality (a settlement) in Kaliningrad Oblast, Russia
Slavske (Slavskoye), an urban-type settlement in Ukraine

See also
 Slava (disambiguation)